The grey wolf or gray wolf is the largest of the wild canines.

Grey Wolfs, Graywolf,  or Grey Wolves may also refer to:
 Gray Wolves (Chicago), a faction of corrupt Chicago aldermen circa 1890s–1930s
 Grey Wolf: The Escape of Adolf Hitler, a 2014 book and film
 Grey wolf (mythology) in Turkic mythology
 Grey Wolves (organization), a Turkish nationalist organization
 Graywolf Press, a U.S. non-profit independent publisher
 MH-139 Grey Wolf, US Air Force version of the AgustaWestland AW139
 Grey Wolves, a novel in Robert Muchamore's Henderson's Boys series
 Grey Wolf, a fictional chieftain in Civilization Revolution
 Grey Wolves, fans of Chapo Trap House
 The Grey Wolves, a British death industrial music group
 The Grey Wolf, a nickname given to Ukrainian fighter pilot Oleksandr Oksanchenko, who was killed by a Russian missile in the Battle of Kyiv during the 2022 Russian invasion of Ukraine.
 The Gray Wolves / Серые волки is a 1993 Russian political drama about Nikita Khrushchev 
 Tsarevitch Ivan, the Firebird and the Gray Wolf, a Russian fairy tale